Univers Zero (also known as Univers Zéro and Univers-Zero) are an instrumental Belgian band formed in 1974 by drummer Daniel Denis. The band is known for its dark style of progressive rock, heavily influenced by 20th-century chamber music.

History
In 1973, Claude Deron and Daniel Denis, both former members of Belgian Zeuhl band Arkham (which had disbanded the previous year), set up a new group, Necronomicon. By that time, apart from Deron (trumpet) and Denis (drums), the group consisted of Roger Trigaux (guitar), Guy Segers (bass guitar), Patrick Hanappier (violin) and John Van Rymenant (sax), and, later on, Vincent Motoulle (keyboards). At the time, Guy Denis (percussion) took part in some shows and rehearsals and Jean-Luc Manderlier (keyboards) was present only during rehearsals. Necronomicon was renamed Univers Zero in 1974.

For a time, Univers Zero were part of a musical movement called Rock in Opposition (RIO) which strove to create dense challenging music, a direct contrast to the disco and punk music being produced in the late 1970s. Obvious early influences were Bartók and Stravinsky, however the band also cited less well known composers such as Albert Huybrechts, who was also Belgian.

Whereas their early albums were almost entirely acoustic, featuring oboes, spinets, harmoniums and Mellotrons, their 1980s albums tended to rely more on synthesizer and electric guitar, sounding much more electric.

In 1977, they released their first eponymous album Univers Zero, later remixed and renamed as 1313. The album shows a heavy rock and roll approach despite the fact that the instrumentation was largely acoustic. This is mostly due to the use of drums and bass guitar. Two years later the album Heresie proved to be even darker. Subsequent albums lightened the sound only slightly but became ever more electric.

Despite these changes, their overall sound remained fairly consistent.

The group disbanded in 1987 but reformed in 1999. In the interim, drummer Daniel Denis released two solo albums and joined Art Zoyd, a similar band from France. Since 1999, Univers Zéro have released five studio albums.

In 2003, Univers Zéro had retired from live performance with Daniel Denis being quoted as saying that only something like a festival would make it financially worthwhile.  Coincidentally soon after, they were invited to headline the first day of NEARfest in Bethlehem, Pennsylvania in June 2004. In 2011, they joined forces with Belgian groups Present and Aranis to form a 17-member ensemble called Once Upon a Time in Belgium. They premiered at the fourth edition of the Rock in Opposition festival held in Carmaux, France in September 2011, where they performed "New York Transformations", a work composed by Kurt Budé. Once Upon a Time in Belgium and Univers Zéro appear in the documentary film Romantic Warriors II: A Progressive Music Saga About Rock in Opposition.

Discography
 1977 : 1313 (originally titled Univers Zero) 
 1979 : Heresie
 1981 : Ceux du dehors
 1981 : Triomphe des mouches (one-sided 7" single) 
 1983 : Crawling Wind
 1984 : Uzed
 1986 : Heatwave
 1999 : The Hard Quest
 2002 : Rhythmix
 2004 : Implosion
 2006 : Live (live album)
 2008 : Relaps (Archives 1984/85/86) (live album)
 2010 : Clivages
 2014 : Phosphorescent Dreams

See also
Romantic Warriors II: A Progressive Music Saga About Rock in Opposition

References

External links
Official Homepage
Official myspace
Univers Zero Record Label
Univers Zero Interview
Univers Zero at exclaim

Belgian progressive rock groups
Rock in Opposition
Musical groups established in 1974
Musical groups disestablished in 1987
Musical groups reestablished in 1999
1974 establishments in Belgium